Admiral Francis William Kennedy, CB (15 December 1862 – 11 July 1939) was a Royal Navy officer.

The son of Robert Kennedy, Lord Lieutenant of Kildare, he entered the Royal Navy in January 1876. He participated in the Anglo-Egyptian War and punitive expeditions in Africa. 

Kennedy assumed command of the battlecruiser HMS Indomitable in 1912. He participated in the pursuit of Goeben and Breslau in 1914 and the Battle of Jutland in 1916.

A West African flag he brought back from the Benin Expedition of 1897 is in the collection of the National Maritime Museum in London as is a personal flag of Itsekiri chief and trader Nana Olumu.

References 

1862 births
1939 deaths
Royal Navy admirals
Royal Navy admirals of World War I
Companions of the Order of the Bath
Younger sons of baronets